Manali is an industrial and residential part of Chennai, India. It is a zone in Greater Chennai Corporation located in the northern part of Chennai district in the Indian state of Tamil Nadu. As of 2011, the neighborhood had a population of 35,248.

History
In October 2011, the erstwhile Manali municipality of Tiruvallur district merged with Greater Chennai Corporation and later became a part of Chennai district since August 2018.

Demographics

According to 2011 census, Manali had a population of 35,248 with a sex-ratio of 968 females for every 1,000 males, much above the national average of 929. A total of 4,208 were under the age of six, constituting 2,194 males and 2,014 females. Scheduled Castes and Scheduled Tribes accounted for 23.33% and 0.09% of the population respectively. The average literacy of the town was 74.52%, compared to the national average of 72.99%. The town had a total of : 9331 households. There were a total of 12,745 workers, comprising 25 cultivators, 49 main agricultural labourers, 127 in house hold industries, 11,293 other workers, 1,251 marginal workers, 12 marginal cultivators, 12 marginal agricultural labourers, 39 marginal workers in household industries and 1,188 other marginal workers. As per the religious census of 2011, Manali had 88.02% Hindus, 3.62% Muslims, 8.04% Christians, 0.02% Sikhs, 0.01% Buddhists, 0.19% Jains, 0.09% following other religions and 0.0% following no religion or did not indicate any religious preference.

Location and surroundings
Manali is a neighborhood of Chennai city.  It borders  Tiruvottiyur to the east,.    Madhavaram to the west, Kodungaiyur to the south, 100 ft road and  Manali New Town  to the North.  The main thoroughfares in the area are Kamarajar Salai, Chinnamathur road, School street, Nedunchezhian street and Parthasarathy street.

Manali Zone
The Manali Zone was named as Zone 2 of Chennai Corporation. The Manali Zone contains 7 wards out of Chennai Corporation's 200 wards from ward 15 to ward 21.

Roads

Expressway
Manali Expressway(100 feet road) runs on the north of Manali and terminates at Thiruvottriyur–Ponneri High Road and joins with Manali High Road.

Other main roads
Other main roads in Manali are Kamarajar Road, School Street, Nedunchezhian Road, Chinnamathur Road and Manali Oil Refinery Road.

Transportation
Tiruvottiyur railway station and Perambur railway station  are the nearest railway stations of Manali, which are 4 km and 8 km away, respectively. Metropolitan Transport Corporation (MTC) runs passenger buses to Manali from other major parts of the Chennai city.
Some of the bus services are :

Some of the buses which passes through Manali are :

Apart from MTC buses, Share Autos plays a major role for transportation in this Area.

Industries
 Chennai Petroleum Corporation Limited (CPCL)—Chennai Petroleum Corporation Limited (formerly MRL) is the largest company in Manali. Started in 1969, CPCL's Manali Refinery now has a capacity of 10.5 million tonnes per year and is one of the most complex refineries in India with fuel, lube, wax and petrochemical feedstocks production facilities. The main products of the company are LPG, motor spirit, superior kerosene, aviation turbine fuel, high-speed diesel, naphtha, bitumen, lube base stocks, paraffin wax, fuel oil, hexane and petrochemical feed stocks.

Other Industries located in Manali are as follows:

 Madras Fertilizers Limited (MFL)
 Manali Petro Chemical Ltd (MPL)
 Futura Polymers Ltd
 Cetex Petro Chemicals Ltd
 Tamil Nadu Petroproducts Limited (TPL)
 Sriram Fibres Ltd (SRF)
 Madras Rubber Factory (MRF)
 Kothari Chemicals and Pesticides
 Balmer Lawrie & Co
 Infra Tanks and Polymers
 The Huntsman Polyurethenes
 ICI Limited
 SRF Limited
 Toshiba JSW Power Systems Private Limited

References

Neighbourhoods in Chennai